The plain softtail (Thripophaga fusciceps) is a species of bird in the family Furnariidae. It is found in Bolivia, Brazil, Ecuador, and Peru. Its natural habitats are subtropical or tropical dry forest, subtropical or tropical moist lowland forest, and subtropical or tropical swamps.

References

plain softtail
Birds of the Amazon Basin
Birds of the Ecuadorian Amazon
Birds of the Peruvian Amazon
Birds of the Bolivian Amazon
plain softtail
plain softtail
Taxonomy articles created by Polbot